Leucanthiza forbesi is a moth of the family Gracillariidae. It is known from Argentina.

The larvae feed on Dichondra repens. They are thought to mine the leaves of their host plant.

References

Lithocolletinae

Moths of South America
Lepidoptera of Argentina
Moths described in 1962